Jens Becker (born 24 May 1965) is a German heavy metal bass guitarist who currently performs with Grave Digger.

History 
Becker was born in Fürth. His first major band was Running Wild, which he joined in 1987. He stayed with them for four years and wrote/co-wrote a couple songs during his time in the band.

Just some time later he had quit Running Wild in 1991, a new speed/heavy metal band called X-Wild was formed by three ex-members of Running Wild (thus the name X (Ex) Wild), which Jens was the only bassist for under its existence. X-Wild disbanded in 1997.

In 1997, the power metal band Grave Digger lost their former bassist Tomi Göttlich and so Jens was asked to take his place. He accepted their offer and has since then remained a solid member of the band and co-writes many of their songs.

Some other bands that he has been involved in are Kingdom Come and also the melodic heavy metal project Zillion, releasing a self-titled album in 2004.

Discography

With Running Wild 
Port Royal (1988)
Death or Glory (1989)
Blazon Stone (1991)

EPs
Bad To The Bone (1989)
Wild Animal (1990)
Little Big Horn (1991)

Live Albums
Ready for Boarding (1988)

With X-Wild 
So What! (1994)
Monster Effect (1994)
Savageland (1996)

With Grave Digger 
Knights of the Cross (1998)
Excalibur (1999)
The Grave Digger (2001)
Rheingold (2003)
The Last Supper (2005)
Liberty or Death (2007)
Ballads of a Hangman (2009)
The Clans Will Rise Again (2010)
Clash of the Gods (2012)
Return of the Reaper (2014)
Healed by Metal (2017)
The Living Dead (2018)
Fields of Blood (2020)

EPs
Yesterday (2006)
Pray (2008)

Singles
The Battle of Bannockburn (1998)
The Round Table (Forever) (1999)
Silent Revolution (2006)

Live Albums
Tunes of Wacken (2002)
25 to Live (2005)

With Zillion 
Zillion (2004)

External links 

 Official Grave Digger homepage
 Jens @ Myspace

1965 births
German heavy metal bass guitarists
Male bass guitarists
Living people
People from Fürth
German male guitarists